Erepsia is a genus of flowering plants belonging to the family Aizoaceae.

Its native range is South African Republic.

Species:

Erepsia anceps 
Erepsia aperta 
Erepsia aristata 
Erepsia aspera 
Erepsia babiloniae 
Erepsia bracteata 
Erepsia brevipetala 
Erepsia × caledonica 
Erepsia distans 
Erepsia dubia 
Erepsia dunensis 
Erepsia esterhuyseniae 
Erepsia forficata 
Erepsia gracilis 
Erepsia hallii 
Erepsia heteropetala 
Erepsia inclaudens 
Erepsia insignis 
Erepsia lacera 
Erepsia oxysepala 
Erepsia patula 
Erepsia pentagona 
Erepsia pillansii 
Erepsia polita 
Erepsia polypetala 
Erepsia promontorii 
Erepsia ramosa 
Erepsia saturata 
Erepsia simulans 
Erepsia steytlerae 
Erepsia urbaniana 
Erepsia villiersii

References

Aizoaceae
Aizoaceae genera
Taxa named by N. E. Brown